The Great Wall Deer is a pickup truck manufactured by the Chinese automaker Great Wall Motors. It is a badge engineered version of the sixth generation Toyota Hilux. It is the pickup version of the Great Wall Safe SUV, and it has been China's most popular pickup truck for over nine years. It is also Great Wall's first pickup to be produced in China. The Wall Deer pickups were built as a replacement for Hongqi CA1021U3 pickups, which were basically based on the Audi 100 that was produced locally in China, although the Wall Deer was slightly larger, and in terminology a true "pickup truck", which was different than the CA1021U3 vehicles, which were basically just coupe utilities, similar to the Chevrolet El Camino. Originally FAW-VW wanted to develop a pickup of their own, but due to issues within the factories that never happened, until 2009, when the company entered a joint venture with General Motors and started producing the FAW-GM Kuncheng pickups.

It has also seen a certain success in the export, for instance to Africa and Latin America. Production commenced in March 1996 and ceased in June 2013.

Versions
It is available in five body styles :
Extra long single cabin
One and a half cabin
Standard double cabin
Medium double cabin
Extra long double cabin

Gallery

Deer
Pickup trucks
1990s cars
2000s cars
2010s cars
Cars of China